Michael Ray Arietti (born October 25, 1947) is a United States diplomat and a career foreign service officer with the U.S. Department of State. He served as United States Ambassador to Rwanda from 2005 to 2008.

Early life and education
Raised in Enfield, Connecticut, Arietti graduated from Enfield High School in 1965. He received a B.A. from Johns Hopkins University in 1970.

Career
After graduating college, he volunteered for the Peace Corps and served in India before joining the Department of State.

Awards and Recognitions
In 2009 he was given the State Department's Charles E. Cobb Jr. Award for Initiative and Success in Trade Development in recognition of his work in Rwanda.

Personal life
Arietti is the son of Michael John Arietti (November 20, 1919 – May 18, 1993) and Margaret M. (Schiller) Arietti (September 6, 1920 – February 22, 2003). Arietti's father served in the Marine Corps during World War II and the couple were married on November 20, 1945 in California. The couple moved back near his father's family in Connecticut in 1948. They had two sons and three grandchildren. His mother was the first female police officer in Enfield, Connecticut.

References

External links
United States Department of State: Biography of Michael R. Arietti
United States Embassy in Kigali: Biography of the Ambassador
The Association for Diplomatic Studies and Training, Foreign Affairs Oral History Project. MICHAEL ARIETTI. Interviewed by: Charles Stuart Kennedy; Initial Interview Date: August 23, 2011; Copyright 2012 ADST
Personnel Announcement, George W. Bush White House, September 13, 2005.

1947 births
Living people
People from Los Angeles County, California
People from Enfield, Connecticut
Johns Hopkins University alumni
Peace Corps volunteers
United States Foreign Service personnel
Ambassadors of the United States to Rwanda